Isabella Shinikova was the defending champion but chose to compete at the 2021 BGL Luxembourg Open instead.

Zheng Saisai won the title, defeating Harmony Tan in the final, 6–4, 3–6, 6–3.

Seeds

Draw

Finals

Top half

Bottom half

References

Main Draw

Portugal Ladies Open - Singles